Kamyshlytamak (Qamışlıtamaq) is a rural locality (a selo) and the administrative centre of Kamyshlytamaksky Selsoviet, Bakalinsky District, Bashkortostan, Russia. The population was 468 as of 2010. There are 9 streets.

Geography 
Kamyshlytamak is located 23 km south of Bakaly (the district's administrative centre) by road. Sakatovo is the nearest rural locality.

References 

Rural localities in Bakalinsky District